Adrian Poparadu (born 13 October 1987 in Timișoara) is a Romanian professional footballer who plays as a midfielder for ACS Dumbrăvița.

Club career

Early career
Poparadu began his youth career at Politehnica Timișoara.

Politehnica Timișoara 
Poparadu made his debut in Liga I in 2007, against the rivals UTA Arad. After Alexandru Bourceanu's and Dan Alexa's departure from Poli, Poparadu began to be in first eleven in midfield with Iulian Tameş. In summer of 2011, he changes his number from 31 to 5, former number of capitan Dan Alexa. He plays twenty minutes in Liga II against Bihor Oradea.

Career statistics

References

External links
 
 

Living people
1987 births
Romanian footballers
Association football midfielders
Liga I players
Liga II players
CSM Reșița players
FC Politehnica Timișoara players
LPS HD Clinceni players
FC Gloria Buzău players
CS Otopeni players
ACS Poli Timișoara players
SSU Politehnica Timișoara players
CSC Dumbrăvița players
Sportspeople from Timișoara